1985 Empress's Cup Final was the 7th final of the Empress's Cup competition. The final was played at National Stadium in Tokyo on March 30, 1986. Shimizudaihachi SC won the championship.

Overview
Defending champion Shimizudaihachi SC won their 6th title, by defeating Takatsuki FC 5–1. Shimizudaihachi SC won the title for 6 years in a row.

Match details

See also
1985 Empress's Cup

References

Empress's Cup
1985 in Japanese women's football